Waking the Fallen is the second studio album by American heavy metal band Avenged Sevenfold, released on August 26, 2003, through Hopeless Records. It is the band's first full-length album with new lead guitarist Synyster Gates and bassist Johnny Christ (although Gates would appear on the reissue of the band's debut album, Sounding the Seventh Trumpet).

Shortly after the release of Waking the Fallen, Avenged Sevenfold left Hopeless Records and were officially signed to Warner Bros. Records on November 1, 2003. The album was released as a double 12-inch gray marble vinyl in 2008 in the US. 

The album was certified gold on July 15, 2009, even though it only sold 3,000 copies on its first week of release. As of August 2014, the album has sold over 693,000 copies in the United States. As of March 17, 2021, the album has been certified Platinum in the United States, Gold in Canada, and Silver in the United Kingdom. The song "Eternal Rest" appears on Kerrang!s "666 Songs You Must Own" and was featured on the soundtrack to the movie Saw IV (2007).

Background 
On January 18, 2002, Avenged Sevenfold left Good Life Recordings and signed with Hopeless Records. They re-released their debut album on March 19 and also appeared on the Hopelessly Devoted to You Vol. 4 sampler in April. The band started to receive recognition, performing with bands such as Mushroomhead and Shadows Fall. They spent the year touring in support of their debut album and participated in the Vans Warped Tour. 

In September of 2002, Dameon Ash left Avenged Sevenfold and was replaced by Johnny Christ. Christ has previously played with the band whenever Ash could not attend, filling in on a tour. Having found a new bassist, the group began recording their new album. Waking the Fallen was released on Hopeless Records in August 2003.

Musical style 
Waking the Fallen featured a more refined and mature sound production in comparison to their previous album. This is the first release by the band to feature lead guitarist Synyster Gates, and the record also features the band's first guitar solos. The record is notable among fans due to M. Shadows' slightly higher pitch in his voice and high notes he sings on songs like "I Won't See You Tonight" (both parts). Although still primarily metalcore, the album also leans towards other styles of metal such as to melodic death metal, thrash metal and power metal.

Reception and legacy 

Waking the Fallen was met with highly positive reviews. Robert L. Doerschuk from AllMusic wrote "And whether attacking a riff in unison or in harmonized parts, the double-threat guitars of Synyster Gates and Zacky Vengeance do their duty like search-and-destroy commandos -- in and out fast, leaving devastation in their wake. Especially noteworthy -- and note-heavy -- is the guitar solo that blazes through the last moments of "Second Heartbeat" and the head-spinning single-stroke virtuosity of the Reverand throughout the album."

It received a positive profile in Billboard, with the magazine comparing Avenged Sevenfold to bands like NOFX, Iron Maiden, and Metallica. In other profiles, the album also received comparisons to the Misfits and further comparisons to Iron Maiden. "Chapter Four" was featured in video games such as NASCAR Thunder 2004, Madden NFL 04, and NHL 04, which helped the band get recognized and sign a contract with Warner Bros. Records. Overall reviews on Ultimate Guitar were very positive and along with 2016's The Stage has the highest overall rating of any Avenged Sevenfold studio albums on Ultimate Guitar.

Metal Hammer magazine placed Waking the Fallen on No. 6 spot of their 100 Greatest Albums of the 21st Century list in 2016.

Videography 
A live performance video was shot at Warped Tour 2003 for "Second Heartbeat". A video was made for the single "Unholy Confessions" on March 6, 2004, using live footage set to the studio track. It featured the fans before and during an Avenged Sevenfold show at the Henry Fonda Theater. According to vocalist M. Shadows, it was requested by their new label, Warner Bros. Records, in order to publicize the band before their 2005 album City of Evil.

This video was the second attempt at a video for the track. The previous attempt was a concept video, filmed three months before. The band was not happy with the final product, however, and opted to re-shoot the video, this time as a live performance. The new video went into rotation on MTV2's Headbangers Ball.

In 2014, a music video for "Chapter Four" was released to promote the release of "Waking The Fallen: Resurrected". The video features clips of the band playing live, shot entirely in black and white. The footage is from the same show was also used for the Unholy Confessions video a decade prior. The video was directed by Rafa Alcantara.

Anniversary 
In March 2014, vocalist M. Shadows revealed in an interview with Loudwire that the band had plans in the works to put something out for the overdue 10th anniversary of Waking the Fallen:

Waking the Fallen: Resurrected was released August 25, 2014.

Track listing 
All songs credited to Avenged Sevenfold.

"Desecrate Through Reverence" is mistakenly written as "Desecrate Through Reverance" in the reissue's booklet.
A slightly longer version of the live versions of "Eternal Rest" was released on the Hopelessly Devoted To You Vol. 5 sampler in 2004. The Resurrected version is mistakenly said to be from Pomona.
The alternate version of "Second Heartbeat", which is the same as the demo version, can also be found on Hopelessly Devoted To You Vol. 4, released in 2002.

Personnel 
Credits are adapted from the album's liner notes.

Avenged Sevenfold

 M. Shadows – lead vocals
 Zacky Vengeance – guitars, backing vocals
 The Rev – drums, percussion, backing vocals
 Synyster Gates – guitars, piano, backing vocals
 Johnny Christ – bass guitar, backing vocals

Production
 Andrew Murdock – producer, mixing engineer
 Fred Archambault – co-producer
 Ai Fujisaki – assistant engineer
 Tom Baker – mastering engineer
 Mike Fasano, Bruce Jacoby, Al Pahanish – drum tech
 Stephen Ferrara – guitar tech
 Scott Gilman – orchestral arrangements and performance

Charts

Certifications

References 

Avenged Sevenfold albums
Metalcore albums
Heavy metal albums
2003 albums
Hopeless Records albums